Seticosta retearia is a species of moth of the family Tortricidae. It is found in Loja Province, Ecuador.

The wingspan is 18 mm. The forewings are brown, but paler terminally. The dorsum is cream, sprinkled with brown and the veins are whitish cream except in the costal blotch. The hindwings are cream, slightly mixed with grey towards the periphery.

Etymology
The species name refers to the forewing markings and is derived from Latin retearia (meaning net).

References

Moths described in 2004
Seticosta